Silberpfeil is a German word translating as silver arrow.

It can refer to the following:

Vehicles
the Silver Arrows racecars by Mercedes-Benz and Auto Union
the TW 2000 tramcars in use on the Hanover Stadtbahn
the Type U cars of the Vienna U-Bahn

Comics
Zilverpijl, a Belgian comic book series, known in Germany as Silberpfeil

See also 
Silver Arrow (disambiguation)